The Indian massacre of 1622, popularly known as the Jamestown massacre, took place in the English Colony of Virginia, in what is now the United States, on 22 March 1622. John Smith, though he had not been in Virginia since 1609 and was not an eyewitness, related in his History of Virginia that warriors of the Powhatan "came unarmed into our houses with deer, turkeys, fish, fruits, and other provisions to sell us". The Powhatan then grabbed any tools or weapons available and killed all the English settlers they found, including   men, women, children of all ages. Chief Opechancanough led the Powhatan Confederacy in a coordinated series of surprise attacks, and they killed a total of 347 people, a quarter of the population of the Virginia colony.

Jamestown, founded in 1607, was the site of the first successful English settlement in North America, and was the capital of the Colony of Virginia. Its tobacco economy, which quickly degraded the land and required new land, led to constant expansion and seizure of Powhatan lands, which ultimately provoked the massacre.

Background 
Upon the settlement's founding in 1607, the local indigenous tribes were willing to trade provisions to the Jamestown colonists for metal tools, though by 1609 governor of the colony John Smith had begun to send raiding parties to demand for provisions from local indigenous settlements. These raiding parties burned down settlements which refused their demands, and frequently stole provisions, leading to resentment towards the colonists and precipitating conflict. The raiding parties further alienated the colonists from the indigenous tribes, who eventually laid siege to the Jamestown fort for several months. Unable to secure more provisions, many colonists in Jamestown died of starvation during the "Starving Time" in 1609–1610.

The London Company's primary concern was the survival of the colony. Due to the interests of the company, the colonists would be required to maintain civil relations with the Powhatan. The Powhatan and the English realized that they could benefit from each other through trade once peace was restored. In exchange for food, the chief asked the colonists to provide him with metal hatchets and copper. Unlike John Smith, other early leaders of Virginia, such as Thomas Dale and Thomas Gates, based their actions on different thinking. They were military men and considered the Powhatan Confederacy as essentially a "military problem."

The Powhatan peoples concluded that the English were not settling in Jamestown for the purposes of trade but rather to "possess" the land. As Chief Powhatan said:

First Anglo-Powhatan War
In 1610, the London Company instructed Gates, the newly appointed colonial governor, to Christianise the natives and absorb them into the colony. As for Chief Powhatan, Gates was told, "If you finde it not best to make him your prisoner yet you must make him your tributary, and all the other his weroances [subordinate chiefs] about him first to acknowledge no other Lord but King James".

When Gates arrived at Jamestown, he decided to evacuate the settlement because he thought the government's plan was not feasible. As the colonists were sailing down the James River towards the open sea they were met by the incoming fleet of Thomas West, 3rd Baron De La Warr off Mulberry Island. Taking command as governor, de la Warr ordered the fort reoccupied. He plotted conquest of the surrounding tribes.

In July 1610, West sent Gates against the Kecoughtan people. "Gates lured the Indians into the open by means of music-and-dance act by his drummer, and then slaughtered them". This was the First Anglo-Powhatan War. The English, led by Samuel Argall, captured Pocahontas, daughter of Powhatan, and held her hostage until he would agree to their demands. The English "demanded that all Powhatan captives be released, return all English weapons taken by his warriors, and agree upon a lasting peace".

While Pocahontas was held by the English, she met John Rolfe, whom she later married. While in captivity, Pocahontas was taught the English language, customs and the Anglican religion. She was baptized as a Christian and took the name Rebecca. Rolfe wrote that the way to maintain peace between the Powhatan and the English, was to marry Pocahontas, not "with the unbridled desire of carnal affection but for the good of the colony and the glory of God. Such a marriage might bring peace between the warring English and Powhatan, just as it would satisfy Pocahontas's desire." After they married, more peaceful relations were maintained for a time between the English colonists and the Powhatan Confederacy. Edward Waterhouse, secretary of the Virginia Company, wrote:

New governance
In 1618, after the death of Powhatan, his brother Opitchapam, a lame and quiet old man, became paramount chief of the confederacy. Their youngest brother, Opechancanough, was probably the effective leader, with his friend, war-chief and advisor Nemattanew. Neither of the younger men believed that peaceful relations with the colonists could be maintained.

Perhaps in 1620–1621, Opitchapam retired or he was deposed (but possibly he died in 1630), and he was succeeded by his youngest brother. Opechancanough and Nemattanew began to develop plans for the unavoidable war. Having recovered from their defeat commanding Pamunkey warriors during the First Anglo-Powhatan War, they planned to shock the English with an attack that would leave them contained in a small trading outpost, rather than expanding throughout the area with new plantations. In the spring of 1622, after a settler murdered his adviser Nemattanew, Opechancanough launched a campaign of surprise attacks on at least 31 separate English settlements and plantations, mostly along the James River, extending as far as Henricus.

Jamestown forewarned 
Jamestown was saved by the warning of an Indian youth living in the home of Richard Pace, one of the colonists.  The youth woke Pace to warn him of the planned attack.  Living across the river from Jamestown, Pace secured his family and rowed to the settlement to spread the alarm. Jamestown increased its defenses.

The name of the Indian who warned Pace is not recorded in any of the contemporary accounts.  Although legend has named him "Chanco", this may be wrong. An Indian named "Chauco" is mentioned in a letter from the Virginia Council to the Virginia Company of London dated April 4, 1623.  He is described not as a youth but as "one...who had lived much amongst the English, and by revealinge yt pl[ot] To divers appon the day of Massacre, saved theire lives..."  "Chauco" may be the same person as "Chacrow", an Indian mentioned in a court record of 25 October 1624 as living with Lt Sharpe, Capt. William Powell, and Capt. William Peirce "in the tyme of Sir Thos Dale's government"—that is, before 1616.  It is possible that the older Indian, Chauco, and the youth who warned Richard Pace have been conflated.

Destruction of other settlements 
During the one-day surprise attack, the Powhatan tribes attacked many of the smaller communities, including Henricus and its fledgling college for children of natives and settlers alike. In the neighborhood of Martin's Hundred, 73 people were killed. More than half the population died in Wolstenholme Towne, where only two houses and a part of a church were left standing. In all, the Powhatan killed about four hundred colonists (a third of the white population) and took 20 women captive.  The captives lived and worked as Powhatan Indians until they died or were ransomed. The settlers abandoned the Falling Creek Ironworks, Henricus, and Smith's Hundred.

Aftermath 

After the attack the surviving English settlers worked on a plan of action. "By unanimous decision both the council and planters it was agreed to draw people together into fewer settlements" for better defense.  The colony intended to gather men together to plan a retaliatory attack, but this was difficult. Of the survivors "two-thirds were said to have been women and children and men who were unable to work or to go against the Indians".
	 
Opechancanough withdrew his warriors, believing that the English would behave as Native Americans would when defeated: pack up and leave, or learn their lesson and respect the power of the Powhatan. Following the event, Opechancanough told the Patawomeck, who were not part of the Confederacy and had remained neutral, that he expected "before the end of two Moones there should not be an Englishman in all their Countries." He misunderstood the English colonists and their backers overseas.

In May 1623, plans were made with Opechancanough to negotiate peace and the release of the missing women. He released Mistress Boyse as a good faith gesture, with the implied message that he would negotiate for the release of the remaining women. Captain Tucker and a group of musketeers met with Opechancanough and members of a Powhatan village along the Potomac River on May 22. In preparation for the event, Dr. John Potts prepared poisoned wine. Captain Tucker and others offered ceremonial toasts and 200 Powhatans died after drinking the wine. Another 50 people were killed. Opechancanough escaped, but a number of tribal leaders were killed. The English retaliated by attacking and burning down Powhatan villages. Tribal members and the captive women fled the English attacks. They also were hungry due to lost corn crops. Three of the women included Jane Dickenson and Mistress Jeffries, the wife of Nathaniel Jeffries, who died in the massacre.

In England when the massacre occurred, John Smith believed that the settlers would not leave their plantations to defend the colony.  He planned to return with a ship filled with soldiers, sailors, and ammunition, to establish a "running Army" able to fight the Powhatan. Smith's goal was to "inforce the Savages to leave their Country, or bring them in the feare of subjection that every man should follow their business securely." Smith, however, never returned to Virginia.

The colonists used the 1622 massacre as a justification for seizing Powhatan land for the next ten years. Historian Betty Wood writes:

Wood quotes a Virginian settler:

The colonists, in revenge for the massacre, attacked the Powhatan through "the use of force, surprise attacks, famine resulting from the burning of their corn, destroying their boats, canoes, and houses, breaking their fishing weirs and assaulting them in their hunting expedition, pursuing them with horses and using bloodhounds to find them and mastiffs to seaze them, driving them to flee within reach of their enemies among other tribes, and 'assimilating and abetting their enemies against them".

Indian decline and defeat

In 1624 Virginia was made an English royal colony by King James I. This meant that the Crown took direct authority rather than allowing guidance by the London Company. The Crown could exercise its patronage for royal favorites. Settlers continued to encroach on land of the Powhatan tribes, and the colonial government tended to change or ignore agreements with the natives when no longer in the colony's interest.  The tribes felt increasing frustration with the settlers.

The next major confrontation with the Powhatan, the Third Anglo-Powhatan War, occurred in 1644, resulting in the deaths of about 500 colonists.  While similar to the death toll in 1622, the loss a generation later represented less than ten percent of the population, and had far less impact upon the colony. This time, the elderly Opechancanough, who was being transported by litter, was captured by the colonists. Imprisoned at Jamestown, he was killed by one of his guards.

His death marked the beginning of the increasingly precipitous decline of the once-powerful Powhatan. Its member tribes eventually left the area entirely, gradually lived among the colonists, or lived on one of the few reservations established in Virginia. Most of these were also subject to incursion and seizure of land by the ever-expanding European population.

In modern times, seven tribes of the original Powhatan Confederacy are recognized in the Commonwealth of Virginia.  The Pamunkey and Mattaponi still have control of their reservations established in the 17th century, each located between the rivers of the same names within the boundaries of present-day King William County.

See also
 List of events named massacres

References

Further reading

The woman who writes about native America Added November 21, 2012.

1622 in Virginia
Conflicts in 1622
Colony of Virginia
English colonization of the Americas
Massacres in the Thirteen Colonies
Powhatan Confederacy
Massacres by Native Americans
Massacres in 1622